Non-linear phononics is the physics in solids created or triggered by large amplitude oscillations of phonons, the elementary vibration of the crystal lattice. It is an extension of the field of phononics,  which studies the regime of small harmonic vibrations and related phenomena in materials. In contrast to phononics, however, large amplitudes oscillation reveal the anharmonicity of the crystal lattice, which theoretical treatment requires the incorporation of higher order terms within the crystal potential.

References 

Quasiparticles